Dikodougou is a town in north-central Ivory Coast. It is a sub-prefecture of and the seat of Dikodougou Department in Poro Region, Savanes District. Dikodougou is also a commune.

In 2014, the population of the sub-prefecture of Dikodougou was 39,567.

Villages
The 29 villages of the sub-prefecture of Dikodougou and their population in 2014 are:

Notes

Sub-prefectures of Poro Region
Communes of Poro Region